Upkeep may refer to:

 Maintenance, repair, and operations
 Upkeep bomb, a bouncing bomb developed in World War II for Operation Chastise